Alemania Glacier, also known as Roncagli Glacier, is a glacier located in Alberto de Agostini National Park, Chile. The advance of one of its lobes blocked the drainage of some streams, forming Martinic Lake.

References

Glaciers of Magallanes Region